Ian Robert Burton Hudson  is a British physician and former government official who served as the chief executive of the Medicines and Healthcare products Regulatory Agency (MHRA) from 2013 to 2019. He later became Senior Advisor, Integrated Development, Global Health for the Bill and Melinda Gates Foundation. He was appointed an OBE for services to healthcare in the 2020 New Year Honours.

Career
Hudson practised as a paediatrician from 1982 to 1989, and then worked in clinical research and development in the pharmaceutical industry, lately as a vice president of SmithKline Beecham, between 1989 and 2001. In 2001 he became director of the licensing division of the then-Medicines Control Agency. He was also the UK delegate to the European Medicines Agency's Committee for Human Medicinal Products, CHMP, (2002-2013), latterly its vice chair and honorary Senior Lecturer in Clinical Pharmacology, William Harvey Research Institute, Queen Mary and Westfield College, university of London (2007-2012). In September 2013 he became chief executive of the Medicines and Healthcare products Regulatory Agency, succeeding Sir Kent Woods.

Hudson was also a member of the European Medicines Agency's management board, a member of the Heads of Medicines Agencies of Europe Management Group and chaired the International Coalition of Medicines Regulatory Authorities between 2016 and 2019. He retired from the MHRA in 2019 and currently is a senior advisor, Integrated Development, Bill and Melinda Gates Foundation. He is also the Chair of the International Review Panel for clinical trial accreditation, UKCRC Clinical Trials Unit Network NIHR, a member of the Centre for Innovation in Regulatory Science scientific advisory board, and a member of the scientific advisory council of TOPRA.  He was appointed an OBE in the 2020 New Year Honours for services to healthcare.

See also
June Raine, CEO of the MHRA from 2019

References

20th-century British medical doctors
British government officials
Officers of the Order of the British Empire